Charles Cobelle, born Carl Edelman (1902–1994) was a modern French master of painting, lithography and a fine muralist, who was born in Alsace-Lorraine, France. He is considered the last link to the great tradition of the Open Line School of Paris.

Biography
Cobelle received his Bachelor's and Master's Degrees from the University of Munich and continued his studies at the École des Beaux-Arts in Paris. Much more influential in his development, however, were his private studies with Marc Chagall and his apprenticeship in the studio of Raoul Dufy in Menton on the Riviera.

Cobelle lived and painted in Paris until the late 1920s and established himself within the great tradition of the School of Paris. In the late 1920s, Cobelle moved to the United States, where his paintings were immediately sought after by galleries and private collectors alike. Cobelle became a U.S. citizen before the outbreak of World War II. In the late 1940s to 1950s, Cobelle lived in Westport, Connecticut.Charles Cobelle lived in Ridgefield CT in a private lake community called Twixt Hills until his death.

By the 1950s, spurred by the commercial success of his mentor, Dufy, Cobelle had achieved phenomenal success commercially with his Parisian-influenced style. Much like contemporary artists and designers at the time, his designs graced a number of pottery patterns for various pottery companies, including Midwinter Stylecraft, Universal Potteries and Homer Laughlin China Company.

In addition to creating advertising illustrations for everything from hosiery to French perfume, Cobelle created a number of murals throughout the country in noteworthy public locations such as The Painted Desert Room of the Desert Inn in Las Vegas, the Mark Hopkins Hotel in San Francisco, Neiman-Marcus in Dallas and on the cruise ships of the Holland America Line.

Art
Throughout his long and prosperous career, Cobelle painted his favorite subjects; Paris street scenes, race tracks, regattas and casinos. The subjects in Cobelle's paintings were not of actual locations or events, but they nevertheless convey the excitement of the places that they depict. This imagery, combined with a vibrant palette of expressive colors, creates a world full of verve and wit that effortlessly transcends reality.

His paintings are characterized by thin, descriptive line-work over broad patches of bold color. First, Cobelle would map out a scene in blocks of bold, expressive color. Then, he would define the imagery with spontaneous, fluid line work. Many of his paintings were painted on canvas with mixed media - oils, acrylics, tempera, conte crayon, ink, whatever was at hand.

In 1965, a fire ravaged his studio at his home in Ridgefield, Connecticut.  As a result, most of his early work was lost, as were all school records and correspondence.

In his later years, which ended with his death in July 1994, he signed his paintings "Chas Cobelle."

Exhibitions
In addition to his mixed media paintings his work has graced the covers of many of this country's leading magazines and his murals have adorned the walls of many elegant residences, public buildings, fine hotels and restaurants.

Collections:
Hartford Antheneum
Wm. Snaith - Pres. Raymond Lowry Assoc.
Mr. Von Rumohr - Collector
Hugh Leighton - Collector St. Croix, V.I.
Mrs. Helen Hart- American Brass Co.
Donald Deskey - Designer
Tamanaco Hotel- Caracas, Venezuela
Mark Hopkins Hotel- San Francisco, Calif.
Henry End - Collector-Int. Designer
Daniel Whitlock - Lazard Freres
Stuart M. Seymour - American Distilling Co.
Parke Bernet Galleries - Paintings sold in 1961, 1962, 1963
Howard Hughes - Collector/Industrialist
Burt Parks - Collector/Celebrity

Cobelle Exhibits:
Niveau Galleries - Palm Beach
Schoneman Galleries
Lord & Taylor
Gallery Revel - New York
70th St. Gallery - New York
Park West Galleries - Michigan

Magazine and Brochure Covers:
Cue Magazine
This Week Magazine
Elizabeth Arden
Round Hill Publishing
Emerald Beach Hotel
Distinguished Resorts

Murals:
Neiman Marcus Co. - Dallas, Texas
The Royal Box - American Hotel, New York
Painted Desert Room at the Desert Inn - Las Vegas, Nevada
Raymond Lowry Associates
Richs - Atlanta, Georgia
Kenyon Hall - Michigan State University
American Tobacco - Caracas, Venezuela
Henry Ford Museum - Murals & Sculpture
Norman Belle Geddes - Murals & Sculpture
Holland American Line - Murals & Sculpture
Cruise Ships of Wilson Line - Murals & Sculpture
Gimbel Bros. - Philadelphia, Pa
Teheran Restaurant - New York
Administration Building - City of New York
Bali-Hi-Room - Robert Meyer Hotel Jacksonville, Florida
Estate Carlton Hotel - St. Croix, V.I.
W.&J. Sloane for Country Club - Spring Lake, N.J.
200 Fifth Ave. Club - New York
Chalfonte Haddon Hall Hotel - Atlantic City, N.J.

References

1902 births
1994 deaths
People from Alsace-Lorraine
French muralists
Modern painters
French artists
Artists from Connecticut
People from Westport, Connecticut
French expatriates in Germany
French emigrants to the United States